Lanzenbach  is a river of Bavaria, Germany. It is a tributary of the Weißach near Oberstaufen.

See also
List of rivers of Bavaria

Rivers of Bavaria
Rivers of Germany